Berwyn Township is one of 29 townships in Cook County, Illinois, USA.  As of the 2010 census, its population was 56,657. It is coterminous with the city of Berwyn.

Berwyn Township, with a population of 56,657 (2010 census) and over 22,000 households includes the area bounded on the north by Roosevelt Road, on the south by Pershing Road (39th Street), on the east by Lombard Avenue (west side of the street only), and on the west by Harlem Avenue (east side of the street only).

Berwyn Township was established by the Illinois Legislature in 1922 as one of the few coterminous townships in the state. The Berwyn Public Health District was established at the same time. The Township and the Berwyn Public Health District are two separate and distinct governmental bodies with separate governing Boards. The Township and Public Health District moved to their present headquarters at 6600 W. 26th Street in 1939. Built for $50,000, construction of the building was made possible by federal grants under the Works Progress Administration (WPA).

Geography

Adjacent townships
 Cicero Township (east)
 Oak Park Township (north)
 Riverside Township (southwest)
 Lyons Township (southwest)
 Proviso Township (northwest)
 Stickney Township (south)

Demographics

References
 
 
 United States Census Bureau 2007 TIGER/Line Shapefiles
 United States National Atlas

External links
 Berwyn Township official website
 City-Data.com
 Illinois State Archives
 Township Officials of Illinois
 Cook County Official Site

Townships in Cook County, Illinois
Townships in Illinois
1922 establishments in Illinois